Gidazepam, also known as hydazepam or hidazepam, is a drug which is an atypical benzodiazepine derivative, developed in the Soviet Union. It is a selectively anxiolytic benzodiazepine. It also has therapeutic value in the management of certain cardiovascular disorders.

Gidazepam is a prodrug for its active metabolite 7-bromo-2,3-dihydro-5-phenyl-1H-1,4-benzodiazepin-2-one (desalkylgidazepam or bromo-nordazepam). It is used as an antianxiety drug. Its anxiolytic effects can take several hours to manifest after dosing however, as it is the active metabolite which primarily gives the anxiolytic effects, and Gidazepam's half-life is among the longest of all GABA-ergic agonists.

See also 
 Phenazepam—another benzodiazepine widely used in Russia and other CIS countries
 Cinazepam
 Cloxazolam

References 

Benzodiazepines
Organobromides
Lactams
Hydrazides
GABAA receptor positive allosteric modulators
Russian drugs
Anxiolytics
Prodrugs
Drugs in the Soviet Union